Craterization is an old medical procedure in which doctors would drill holes into people's heads to remove a foreign mass (i.e., a tumor).  It gets its name from the crater-like holes it leaves behind.

References

Medical treatments